Kevin Park (born September 2, 1964 in Hythe, Alberta) is a Canadian curler from Edmonton, Alberta.

Career

Early career
Park was a two time provincial junior champion in his native Alberta, winning in 1983 and 1984.

Park played third for Kevin Martin from 1990 to 1995. During this time, he won the Brier in 1991 and a silver medal at the World Curling Championships. He also played for Canada at the 1992 Winter Olympics where curling was a demonstration sport - the team finished fourth. Park would also play in the 1992 and 1995 Briers with Martin.

1995-2008
After playing for Martin, Park formed his own team, which had some success on the World Curling Tour, and involved trips to the 1997 Canadian Olympic Curling Trials, and 2001 Olympic Trials. He placed second on the World Curling Tour money list in 1996 and placed third in 1997 . The 1995-96 season included victories at the Merchant Cash Spiel and the Canadian North Arctic Briar. As a skip, Park wouldn't win another major bonspiel until the Pointoptical Curling Classic in 2000. In 2002 he won the Wheat City Curling Classic and the Norris Bros. Roaming Buffalo Classic. In 2003 he won the Whites Drug Store Classic, playing third for Doran Johnson. In 2007, he won the John Shea Insurance Canada Cup Qualifier, subbing in for Blake MacDonald as third for Kevin Koe's rink.  Park played at the subsequent 2008 Canada Cup of Curling, playing third for Kevin Martin instead (subbing for an injured John Morris).

2008-2011
Park would then join with Jeff Stoughton's Winnipeg rink in 2008. He made it to his fourth Brier, in 2009 playing for Stoughton. He came under controversy from curling traditionalists for not actually living in Manitoba, the province he represented at the 2009 and 2010 Tim Hortons Brier. However, to meet residence requirements, Park would share an apartment in Winnipeg with Pat McCallum where he resides September through March, which allowed him to participate. In April 2010, Park left the team. It was announced later in the month that he has decided to remain curling in Manitoba for the 2010-11 season, except this time, forming his own team. Park skipped his own team, consisting of Pat McCallum at lead, Taren Gesell at second, and Chris Galbraith at third. His new team had a decent season, reaching the semi-finals of two World Curling Tour events.

2011-present
Park returned to Edmonton in 2011 to form a new team, consisting of Shane Park, Aaron Sluchinski and Justin Sluchinski. He joined the Robert Schlender rink in 2014.

Personal life
Park is a website database manager for Delvi Data.

His daughter is a curler and coach Kalynn Park, 2015 Canadian mixed doubles curling champion curler.

Grand Slam record

Notes

External links 
 
 Video: 

1964 births
Living people
Brier champions
Curlers from Edmonton
People from the County of Grande Prairie No. 1
Curlers at the 1992 Winter Olympics
Canadian male curlers
Canada Cup (curling) participants